Heybatgulu Mammadbayov was an Azerbaijani statesman who served as State Controller in the fifth cabinet of Azerbaijan Democratic Republic, and was member of Parliament of Azerbaijan.

In 1918, Mammadbayov was a member of Azerbaijani National Council which proclaimed independence of Azerbaijan Democratic Republic on May 28, 1918. 

On December 22, 1919 when the fifth government under the leadership of Prime Minister Nasib Yusifbeyli was formed, Mammadbayov was appointed the State Controller.

See also
Azerbaijani National Council
Cabinets of Azerbaijan Democratic Republic (1918-1920)
Current Cabinet of Azerbaijan Republic

References

Azerbaijani Muslims
Azerbaijan Democratic Republic politicians
Government ministers of Azerbaijan
Members of the National Assembly of the Azerbaijan Democratic Republic